Lara Fabian is a Belgian-Italian international singer. It is also the name of two albums by that singer:

 Lara Fabian (1991 album) (in French)
 Lara Fabian (2000 album) (in English)